Pierluigi Onorato (17 August 1938 – 5 March 2023) was an Italian politician. A member of the Italian Communist Party and the Independent Left, he served in the Chamber of Deputies from 1979 to 1987 and in the Senate of the Republic from 1987 to 1992.

Onorato died in Florence on 5 March 2023, at the age of 84.

References

1938 births
2023 deaths
Italian judges
Italian Communist Party politicians
Deputies of Legislature VIII of Italy
Deputies of Legislature IX of Italy
Deputies of Legislature X of Italy
Sapienza University of Rome alumni
University of Pisa alumni
People from La Maddalena